The ocean sunfish or common mola (Mola mola) is one of the largest bony fish in the world. It was misidentified as the heaviest bony fish, which was actually a different species, Mola alexandrini. The species is native to tropical and temperate waters around the world. It resembles a fish head without a tail, and its main body is flattened laterally. Sunfish can be as tall as they are long when their dorsal and ventral fins are extended.

Sunfish are generalist predators that consume largely small fish, fish larvae, squid, and crustaceans. Sea jellies and salps, once thought to be the primary prey of sunfish, make up only 15% of a sunfish's diet. Females of the species can produce more eggs than any other known vertebrate, up to 300,000,000 at a time. Sunfish fry resemble miniature pufferfish, with large pectoral fins, a tail fin, and body spines uncharacteristic of adult sunfish.

Adult sunfish are vulnerable to few natural predators, but sea lions, killer whales, and sharks will consume them. Sunfish are considered a delicacy in some parts of the world, including Japan, Korea, and Taiwan. In the European Union, regulations ban the sale of fish and fishery products derived from the family Molidae. Sunfish are frequently caught in gillnets.

A member of the order Tetraodontiformes, which also includes pufferfish, porcupinefish, and filefish, the sunfish shares many traits common to members of this order. The ocean sunfish, Mola mola, is the type species of the genus.


Naming and taxonomy

Many of the sunfish's various names allude themselves to its flattened shape. Its scientific name, mola, is Latin for "millstone", which the fish resembles because of its gray color, rough texture, and rounded body. Its common English name, sunfish, refers to the animal's habit of sunbathing at the surface of the water. Its common names in Dutch, Portuguese, French, Spanish, Catalan, Italian, Russian, Greek, Hungarian, Norwegian, and German (maanvis, peixe lua, Poisson lune, pez luna, peix lluna, Pesce luna, рыба-луна, φεγγαρόψαρο, holdhal, månefisk and Mondfisch, respectively) mean "moon fish", in reference to its rounded shape. In German, the fish is also known as Schwimmender Kopf, or "swimming head". In Polish, it is named samogłów, meaning "head alone" or "only head", because it has no true tail. In Swedish, Danish and Norwegian it is known as klumpfisk, in Dutch klompvis, in Finnish möhkäkala, all of which mean "lump fish".
The ocean sunfish has various superseded binomial synonyms, and was originally classified in the pufferfish genus, as Tetraodon mola.
It is now placed in its own genus, Mola, with three species: Mola mola, Mola tecta and Mola alexandrini (previously known as Mola ramsayi). The ocean sunfish, Mola mola, is the type species of the genus.

The genus Mola belongs to the family Molidae. This family comprises three genera: Masturus, Mola and Ranzania. The common name "sunfish" without qualifier is used to describe the marine family Molidae and the freshwater sunfish in the family Centrarchidae, which is unrelated to Molidae. On the other hand, the name "ocean sunfish" and "mola" refer only to the family Molidae.

The family Molidae belongs to the order Tetraodontiformes, which includes pufferfish and filefish. It shares many traits common to members of this order, including the four fused teeth that form the characteristic beak and give the order its name (=four, =tooth, and =shape). Indeed, sunfish fry resemble spiky pufferfish more than they resemble adult molas.

Description

The caudal fin of the ocean sunfish is replaced by a rounded clavus, creating the body's distinct truncated shape. The body is flattened laterally, giving it a long oval shape when seen head-on. The pectoral fins are small and fan-shaped, while the dorsal fin and the anal fin are lengthened, often making the fish as tall as it is long.

The spinal column of M. mola contains fewer vertebrae and is shorter in relation to the body than that of any other fish.
Although the sunfish descended from bony ancestors, its skeleton contains largely cartilaginous tissues, which are lighter than bone, allowing it to grow to sizes impractical for other bony fishes. Its teeth are fused into a beak-like structure, which prevents them from being able to fully close their mouths, while also having pharyngeal teeth located in the throat.

The sunfish lacks a swim bladder. Some sources indicate the internal organs contain a concentrated neurotoxin, tetrodotoxin, like the organs of other poisonous tetraodontiformes, while others dispute this claim.

Fins
In the course of its evolution, the caudal fin (tail) of the sunfish disappeared, to be replaced by a lumpy pseudotail, the clavus. This structure is formed by the convergence of the dorsal and anal fins, and is used by the fish as a rudder. The smooth-denticled clavus retains 12 fin rays and terminates in a number of rounded ossicles.

Ocean sunfish often swim near the surface, and their protruding dorsal fins are sometimes mistaken for those of sharks. However, the two can be distinguished by the motion of the fin. Unlike most fish, the sunfish swings its dorsal fin and anal fin in a characteristic sculling motion.

Skin
Adult sunfish range from brown to silvery-grey or white, with a variety of region-specific mottled skin patterns. Coloration is often darker on the dorsal surface, fading to a lighter shade ventrally as a form of countershading camouflage. M. mola also exhibits the ability to vary skin coloration from light to dark, especially when under attack. The skin on the clavus is smoother than that on the body, where it can be as rough as sandpaper.

More than 40 species of parasites may reside on the skin and internally, motivating the fish to seek relief in a number of ways. One of the most frequent ocean sunfish parasites is the flatworm Accacoelium contortum.

In temperate regions, drifting kelp fields harbor cleaner wrasses and other fish which remove parasites from the skin of visiting sunfish. In the tropics, M. mola solicits cleaning help from reef fishes. By basking on its side at the surface, the sunfish also allows seabirds to feed on parasites from its skin.

Range and behavior

Ocean sunfish are native to the temperate and tropical waters of every ocean in the world. Mola genotypes appear to vary widely between the Atlantic and Pacific, but genetic differences between individuals in the Northern and Southern hemispheres are minimal.

While this might be the case most of the time, they are also capable of moving rapidly when feeding or avoiding predators, to the extent that they can vertically leap out of water. Surface basking behavior, in which a sunfish swims on its side, presenting its largest profile to the sun, may be a method of "thermally recharging" following dives into deeper, colder water in order to feed. Sightings of the fish in colder waters outside of its usual habitat, such as those southwest of England, may be evidence of increasing marine temperatures, although the proximity of England's southwestern coast to the Gulf Stream means that many of these sightings may also be the result of the fish being carried to Europe by the current.

Sunfish are usually found alone, but occasionally in pairs.

Feeding
The diet of the ocean sunfish was formerly thought to consist primarily of various jellyfish. However, genetic analysis reveals that sunfish are actually generalist predators that consume largely small fish, fish larvae, squid, and crustaceans, with jellyfish and salps making up only around 15% of the diet. Occasionally they will ingest eel grass. This range of food items indicates that the sunfish feeds at many levels, from the surface to deep water, and occasionally down to the seafloor in some areas.

Lifecycle
Ocean sunfish may live up to ten years in captivity, but their lifespan in a natural habitat has not yet been determined. Their growth rate remains undetermined.

The sheer size and thick skin of an adult of the species deters many smaller predators, but younger fish are vulnerable to predation by bluefin tuna and mahi mahi. Adults are consumed by orca, sharks and sea lions.

The mating practices of the ocean sunfish are poorly understood, but spawning areas have been suggested in the North Atlantic, South Atlantic, North Pacific, South Pacific, and Indian oceans. Females are estimated to be carrying as many as 300 million eggs, more than any other known vertebrate. Sunfish eggs are released into the water and externally fertilized by sperm.

They develop into fry, and those which survive can grow up to 60 million times their original weight before reaching adult proportions, arguably the most extreme size growth of any vertebrate animal.

Sunfish fry, with large pectoral fins, a tail fin, and body spines uncharacteristic of adult sunfish, resemble miniature pufferfish, their close relatives.
Young sunfish school for protection, but this behavior is abandoned as they grow.

Genome
In 2016, researchers from China National Genebank and A*STAR Singapore, including Nobel laureate Sydney Brenner, sequenced the genome of the ocean sunfish and discovered several genes which might explain its fast growth rate and large body size. As member of the order Tetraodontiformes, like fugu, the sunfish has quite a compact genome, at 730 Mb in size. Analysis from this data suggests that sunfish and pufferfishes diverged approximately 68 million years ago, which corroborates the results of other recent studies based on smaller datasets.

Human interaction

Despite their size, ocean sunfish are docile and pose no threat to human divers. Injuries from sunfish are rare, although a slight danger exists from large sunfish leaping out of the water onto boats; in one instance, a sunfish landed on a 4-year-old boy when the fish leaped onto the boy's family's boat. Areas where they are commonly found are popular destinations for sport dives, and sunfish at some locations have reportedly become familiar with divers. They are more of a problem to boaters than to swimmers, as they can pose a hazard to watercraft due to their large size and weight. Collisions with sunfish are common in some parts of the world and can cause damage to the hull of a boat,
or to the propellers of larger ships, as well as to the fish.

The flesh of the ocean sunfish is considered a delicacy in some regions, the largest markets being Taiwan and Japan. All parts of the sunfish are used in cuisine, from the fins to the internal organs.
Some parts are used in some areas of traditional medicine. Fishery products derived from sunfish are forbidden in the European Union according to Regulation (EC) No 853/2004 of the European Parliament and of the Council as they contain toxins that are harmful to human health.

Sunfish are accidentally but frequently caught in drift gillnet fisheries, making up nearly 30% of the total catch of the swordfish fishery employing drift gillnets in California. The bycatch rate is even higher for the Mediterranean swordfish industry, with 71% to 90% of the total catch being sunfish.

The fishery bycatch and destruction of ocean sunfish are unregulated worldwide. In some areas, the fish are "finned" by fishermen who regard them as worthless bait thieves; this process, in which the fins are cut off, results in the eventual death of the fish, because it can no longer propel itself without its dorsal and anal fins.
The species is also threatened by floating litter such as plastic bags which resemble jellyfish, a common prey item. Bags can choke and suffocate a fish or fill its stomach to the extent that it starves.

Many areas of sunfish biology remain poorly understood, and various research efforts are underway, including aerial surveys of populations, satellite surveillance using pop-off satellite tags, genetic analysis of tissue samples, and collection of amateur sighting data. A decrease in sunfish populations may be caused by more frequent bycatch and the increasing popularity of sunfish in human diet.

In captivity

Sunfish are not widely held in aquarium exhibits, due to the unique and demanding requirements of their care. Some Asian aquaria display them, particularly in Japan. The Kaiyukan Aquarium in Osaka is one of few aquariums with M. mola on display, where it is reportedly as popular an attraction as the larger whale sharks.
The Lisbon Oceanarium in Portugal has sunfish showcased in the main tank, and in Spain, the Valencia Oceanogràfic has specimens of sunfish. The Ocean sunfish is also on display at the Denmark Nordsøen Oceanarium.

In Kamogawa Sea World the ocean sunfish named Kukey, who started captivity in 1982, set a world record for captivity for 2,993 days, living for eight years.

While the first ocean sunfish to be held in an aquarium in the United States is said to have arrived at the Monterey Bay Aquarium in August 1986, other specimens have previously been held at other locations. Marineland of the Pacific, closed since 1987 and located on the Palos Verdes Peninsula in Los Angeles County, California, held at least one ocean sunfish by 1961, and in 1964 held a  specimen, said to be the largest ever captured at that time. However, another  specimen was brought alive to Marineland Studios Aquarium, near St. Augustine, Florida, in 1941.

Because sunfish had not been kept in captivity on a large scale before, the staff at Monterey Bay was forced to innovate and create their own methods for capture, feeding, and parasite control. By 1998, these issues were overcome, and the aquarium was able to hold a specimen for more than a year, later releasing it after its weight increased by more than 14 times. Mola mola has since become a permanent feature of the Open Sea exhibit. Monterey Bay Aquarium's largest sunfish specimen was euthanized on February 14, 2008, after an extended period of poor health.

A major concern to curators is preventive measures taken to keep specimens in captivity from injuring themselves by rubbing against the walls of a tank, since ocean sunfish cannot easily maneuver their bodies. In a smaller tank, hanging a vinyl curtain has been used as a stopgap measure to convert a cuboid tank to a rounded shape and prevent the fish from scraping against the sides. A more effective solution is simply to provide enough room for the sunfish to swim in wide circles. The tank must also be sufficiently deep to accommodate the vertical height of the sunfish, which may reach .

Feeding captive sunfish in a tank with faster-moving, more aggressive fish can also present a challenge. Eventually, the fish can be taught to respond to a floating target to be fed, and to take food from the end of a pole or from human hands.

References

External links

Research and info
 FishBase reference
 Australian Museum
 OceanSunfish.org

Images and videos
 Mike Johnson Natural History Photography
 Phillip Colla Photography/Oceanlight.com
 Video lecture (16:53): Swim with giant sunfish in the open ocean - Tierney Thys
 Skaphandrus.com Mola mola photos
 

ocean sunfish
Pantropical fish
ocean sunfish
ocean sunfish